is a Japanese animator, storyboard artist, and director. Some of his major works directed include the first Kanon series released in 2002, and Digimon Data Squad, the latter of which had a run of 48 episodes in 2006–07. In 2015, he directed the anime adaptation of the Overlord novel series.

Filmography

Anime

References

External links 

 Naoyuki Ito anime works at Media Arts Database 

Anime directors
Living people
Year of birth missing (living people)
Place of birth missing (living people)